Nini Bulterijs (20 November 1929 – 12 December 1989) was a Belgian composer. She was born in Temse, East Flanders, and studied piano with Jozef d'Hooghe and harmony with Yvonne van den Berghe at the Royal Flemish Conservatory of Antwerp. She continued her studies in composition with Jean Louel privately and with Jean Absil at the Chapelle Musicale Reine Elisabeth.

After completing her studies, she taught at small music schools in Hamme, Vilvoorde and Mechelen before taking a position as professor at the Lemmens Institute at Louvain and in 1970 at the Royal Flemish Conservatory of Antwerp. She retired from teaching in 1988 and died in Wilrijk.
 
Bulterijs won second place in the 1963 Prix de Rome contest and in the 1966 Queen Elisabeth International Composition Competition. She received the 1969 Emile Doehaerd Prize.

Works
Bulterijs composed orchestral, chamber ensemble, choral and instrumental works and songs. Selected compositions include:
Sonata, 2 violins, pianoforte, 1960
Symphonic Movements, orchestra, 1960
Pianoforte Concerto, 1961
Trio for piano, viol and cello, 1962
Arion (cantata, text: B. Decorte), solo violin, chorus, orchestra, 1963
Concerto, 2 violin, orchestra, 1964
Symphony, 1965
Violin Concerto, 1968
Rondo, violin, pianoforte, 1972

Her music has been recorded and issued on media, including:
Symphony (1965) Daniel Sternefeld/Belgian National Orchestra ( + Fontyn: Psalmus Tertius) (LP) CULTURA 5071-1 (1973)

References

1929 births
1989 deaths
20th-century classical composers
Belgian music educators
Women classical composers
Belgian classical composers
People from Temse
Women music educators
20th-century women composers